Sandra Záhlavová (born 10 October 1985) is a Czech former tennis player.

Záhlavová won 12 singles and nine doubles titles on the ITF Women's Circuit in her career. On 21 June 2010, she reached her best singles ranking of world No. 78. On 12 June 2006, she peaked at No. 165 in the doubles rankings.

Personal
She was related to tennis player Barbora Strýcová by marriage — her cousin, tennis coach Jakub Záhlava, was Strýcová's husband until their divorce in 2015.

ITF finals

Singles (12–13)

Doubles (9–13)

References

External links
 
 

1985 births
Living people
Sportspeople from Plzeň
Czech female tennis players